Agalagurki  is a village in the southern state of Karnataka, India. It is located in the Chikkaballapur taluk of Chikkaballapura district in Karnataka.

See also
 Chikkaballapur
 Districts of Karnataka

References

External links
 https://web.archive.org/web/20190310100553/http://www.chikballapur.nic.in/

Villages in Chikkaballapur district